National Botanic(al) Garden(s) may refer to: 

 Australian National Botanic Gardens, Canberra
 China National Botanical Garden, Beijing
 National Botanic Gardens (Ireland), Dublin
 National Botanic Garden of Belgium
 National Botanic Garden of Wales
 National Botanic Garden (Zimbabwe), Harare
 National Botanic Gardens of India
 National Botanical Garden (Botswana), Gaborone
 National Kandawgyi Botanical Gardens, Burma
 National Tropical Botanical Garden, four gardens in Hawaii and Florida
 South China National Botanical Garden, Guangzhou
 United States Botanic Garden, Washington, DC
 Kirstenbosch National Botanical Garden, South Africa
 Hryshko National Botanical Garden, Kyiv, Ukraine

See also
List of botanical gardens